Death Race 3: Inferno (also known as Death Race 3 and Death Race: Inferno) is a 2013 American science fiction action film directed by Roel Reiné. It is the third installment in the Death Race film series and set between the events of Death Race 2 (2010) and Death Race (2008). The film was released direct-to-video on January 22, 2013.

It was followed by Death Race: Beyond Anarchy in 2018.

Plot

Death Race owner R. H. Weyland has been forced to sell the rights to Niles York, an ambitious and ruthless British billionaire who acquired the rights by a hostile takeover and who intends to relocate the Death Race to South Africa. Before leaving, Weyland arranges Carl Lucas, also known as Frankenstein, to have his face fixed, which was disfigured during a life-threatening crash in the previous film. With Lucas just one win away from his freedom, York fears losing the huge Frankenstein fanbase and threatens to kill Lucas if he wins his fifth race.

As the crew from Terminal Island reaches the facility in South Africa, a scuffle breaks out, forcing Lucas in his Frankenstein persona to cut in. However, his mask is knocked off during the fight, revealing to his team of Katrina Banks, Goldberg, and Lists that he has been hiding his identity behind the mask during the previous races.

Before the first race, the pool of female navigators are pitted against each other to participate in the "Navigator Wars", a gladiator-style armed fight to the death. The show is now hosted and produced by Satana, on behalf of Niles York. Ten surviving navigators, including Katrina, are assigned to their drivers. Afterwards, all race participants are shot on their necks with GPS trackers, so the showrunners can track them and, if necessary, kill them if they attempt to escape.

The first race, in the Kalahari Desert, reveals how the terrain calls for a racing strategy totally different from the one on the Terminal Island prison course. Lucas manages to regain Goldberg's trust, but not Katrina's. Eleven racers compete, but Jackal makes a jump start, only to be blown up by a tracking missile. Three racers and their navigators die during the race, while Razor beats Frankenstein to win the first day.

Katrina, still heartbroken that Lucas has kept his survival secret from her all along, distances herself from him. When Goldberg gets a flesh wound from another brawl that follows, the show's surgeon, Olivia, makes advances and the two establish a relationship. In order to make Katrina jealous, Satana orders Psycho's navigator Amber to have sex with Lucas.

Satana and Niles York grow suspicious that Lucas is up to something due to his non-rebellious attitude to being forced to lose. Elsewhere, Lucas meets with his crew, apologizing and explaining what they were up against. Having regained everyone's trust, Lucas also says that he has made a "new deal".

The second race commences with the death of three more teams. Fury is killed after being tricked by Olga Braun (Death Race's first-ever female driver) and she is in turn run over by Razor. Razor struggles to handle both Lucas and Psycho before the three are joined by 14K, having disabled Nero's truck, before leaving him to get beaten to death by an angry mob of locals. The second race ends with Lucas victorious, but Goldberg is caught in an explosion caused by stray bullets from local hostile war lords, and Olivia pronounces him dead.

York reminds Lucas to lose his next race to 14K, or he will have Katrina tortured. Satana discovers York wishes to replace her as producer and remove her from the Death Race so he can assume control. Before the next race, Katrina confesses her love to Lucas, and Lucas reveals he did not sleep with Amber.

Before the final race, Psycho and Lucas have a chat about the identity of Frankenstein, and whether Lucas was the first or even the last. During the final race, Niles York is determined to keep Lucas from winning at any cost. Razor disables Psycho's car, and Psycho dies in the flames, while an uninjured  Amber is left behind to meet an unknown fate. Lucas takes the lead with York going into a frenzy, and ordering him killed with a tracking missile. However, 14K shoots flares to divert the missile and destroy it, saving his life and repaying his "life for a life" debt from the race back in Terminal Island. York has enough of Prudence, his secretary, who was against his ruthless actions all along, and fires her.

Lucas holds a commanding lead and kills many of the prison guards along the way. In an unexpected twist, Lucas relinquishes the lead to 14K and turns off to find York. Satana handcuffs York to a table for his betrayal. Lucas crashes his car into the control room and explodes, engulfing the room in flames. It appears that everyone, except a facially disfigured Lucas, perished in the crash. However, at the medical facility, Lucas yells that he is Niles York, not Frankenstein. Olivia, Lists and the GPS tracking chip confirm it to be Lucas/Frankenstein, and they report the same to Prudence, who fills in for the late Niles York. She returns the Death Race to Terminal Island and assigns Hennessy in charge of the race, while recruiting "Coach" as the fill-in for the late Goldberg.

In a set of flashbacks, it is revealed that Lucas' "new deal" was the one with Weyland while at the hospital, providing Olivia as an insider, faking Goldberg's death, having Satana yield to Weyland, trapping Niles York in the control room right before the planned car crash, Lucas and Katrina ejecting secretly from the car before the crash, Olivia planting the GPS tracker with Frankenstein's I.D into York's body, everyone escaping from the prison, and York and Katrina being pronounced dead. With York now officially "dead", Weyland regains control of the Death Race and grants the team their freedom, though Lists refuses and returns to Terminal Island. Weyland pays Lucas and his team (including Olivia) a substantial amount of money for their help, which they use to relocate. Meanwhile, defeated in his own dirty game, York is now forced to wear the identity of Frankenstein, hoping to gain his freedom and have his revenge while racing at Terminal Island in the future (as seen in the first film).

Cast

Reception 
 Scott Foy of Dread Central rated it 3/5 stars and wrote, "Movies like Death Race 3: Inferno are like a piece of chewing gum – the flavor is fleeting, you spit it out when you're done without hesitation, but it gave you the minor fix you were after." Jesse Skeen of DVD Talk rated it 3/5 stars and wrote, "This movie probably won't win any awards, but it's great mindless fun." David Johnson of DVD Verdict called it an "ultimately a loud and tedious chore." Scott Weinberg of Fearnet wrote, "Cheap, choppy, and almost shamelessly by-the-numbers, Death Race 3 earns points for the same reason its predecessor did: it's quick, slick, enjoyably empty-headed, just energetic enough to smash through the finish line".

References

External links
 

Death Race (franchise)
2013 direct-to-video films
2010s English-language films
Direct-to-video sequel films
Direct-to-video prequel films
Direct-to-video interquel films
2013 science fiction action films
2013 films
Films set in deserts
Films set in South Africa
Films shot in South Africa
American science fiction action films
American sequel films
American chase films
American dystopian films
2010s road movies
American road movies
Universal Pictures direct-to-video films
Films directed by Roel Reiné
Films produced by Paul W. S. Anderson
Films produced by Mike Elliott
Films with screenplays by Paul W. S. Anderson
2010s American films
American prequel films